Wheeler Dealers is a British TV series originally produced by Attaboy TV for the Discovery Channel in the UK and for Motor Trend in the U.S. The programme is fronted by car enthusiast and former dealer Mike Brewer with mechanics Edd China (Series 1-13), Ant Anstead (Series 14–16), and Marc Priestley, (Series 17 onward).

The premise of the show has the presenters on a mission to save old and repairable enthusiast vehicles, by repairing or otherwise improving an example of a particular make and model to a budget then selling it to a new owner.

The programme was created by Daniel Allum and Michael Wood, the founding directors of Attaboy TV, both long-time car enthusiasts.

Series 1 was aired in 2003. Series 5 was renamed Wheeler Dealers On the Road, with Brewer and China expanding their car search by heading out into Europe hoping to find classic cars to buy and restore. The second half of Series 6 was aired in autumn of 2009 on Discovery Real Time.

Beginning with part 2 of Series 8, Brewer further expanded their horizon by touring the United States. In Series 12, Brewer and China set up a new workshop in a rented bay at Huntington Beach Bodyworks, 18108 Redondo Circle, Huntington Beach, California. This decision was made so that they could deliver more episodes of the show and meant they were able to restore and sell the cars on the spot, instead of having them shipped back to the UK. Once the American operation was established, it moved to more suitable premises at 5382 Research Drive, Huntington Beach. Series 17 (2021) saw the show filming return to the UK.

In April 2013 a spinoff series titled Wheeler Dealers Trading Up was launched. This series was produced by X2 Productions Ltd and has Brewer travelling around the world to buy and sell but not repair or restore used cars in different countries on a set budget. A second spinoff series titled Wheeler Dealers: Dream Car premiered in January 2020, with Brewer and mechanic Marc "Elvis" Priestley lending their expertise to add value to clients' cars helping them trade up to their dream vehicle.

Format 

In each episode, Brewer buys a vehicle, turns it over to his mechanic for repairs, then sells it. For the first series, the budget was £1,000, for series 2, £2,000, and for series 3, £3,000. Budgets in subsequent series have varied, depending on the target vehicle. For example, a £10,000 budget was set on buying and restoring a Ferrari Dino 308 GT4 in series 6. For series 11 (2014), the budget is listed on the show's Discovery UK website as "up to £20,000".
The presentation for each project usually follows a similar TV format. Through series 6, the project was presented in two 30-minute episodes. Starting with series 7, the format was changed to single 60 minute (including commercials) episodes.

Summary 
The programme was created with a DIYer in mind. The costs, and thus any profit or loss for a given project, are assessed without consideration of the labour costs of the mechanic (the assumption is that a well-equipped and able enthusiast could complete all work him or herself) but if repairs require professional help, like body resprays, complicated electronics, or windscreen replacements, they are added to the final cost.

Also addressed on each vehicle are its service history, bodywork defects (e.g. rust, dents), worn-out interiors and accessories. Vehicles that have either been inactive for long periods of time or purchased from outside the UK are restored and modified to pass the country's mandatory MOT test.

In common with most similar programmes, Wheeler Dealers features much incidental on-screen advertising. Logos for tools, supplies and equipment are always prominently displayed. Specialist repairers of parts and sub-systems, along with upholsterers, etc. always get adequate coverage in return for favourable price deals. Sometimes, parts and equipment are supplied free of charge.

Part one 
 Brewer starts with a budget to buy and then fix up a vehicle.
 Brewer gives a brief history of the merits of the chosen model of vehicle.
 Brewer locates, test drives, negotiates for and buys the vehicle (usually sealed with a handshake and Brewer triumphantly expressing to camera that he's just bought a <name of vehicle>).
(Starting from series 5, prospective cars Brewer wanted to buy, but needed too much work, were shown. This also took place in Series 1, Episode 7).
 Brewer turns the vehicle over to the mechanic, and together they assess its needs.
 The mechanic begins work, providing assessments of the work and its challenges.
 Brewer stops by the workshop for an overview of progress, and expenditures are reviewed.

Part two 
 A quick review of the first episode (for series where each project is split into two episodes).
 Brewer goes on a field trip to procure some required parts.
 Brewer interviews an owner of a similar vehicle in top condition, then drives and comments on the car. Brewer also assesses the merit and likelihood of getting the Wheeler Dealers example to the same condition as the example he is driving. (This feature was dropped from series 5 onwards)
 The mechanic finishes the work on the project vehicle which is subsequently shown on a revolving turntable.
 Brewer returns to the workshop and discusses the finished vehicle with the mechanic.
 There is a final tally of expenditures.
 Brewer drives the completed car, assessing improvements.
(Starting from series 5, Brewer and the mechanic test drive the finished vehicle together and discuss its resale value.)
 Brewer sells the vehicle to a new owner (after the inevitable haggling). (Starting from series 5, prospective buyers who failed to buy the car are occasionally shown)
 The deal is sealed when Brewer says, "Hold out your hand, you've just bought a <name of vehicle>!" and shakes the new buyer's hand.
 Brewer summarises what the final selling price and profit is (or in rare instances what the loss is) and usually states that they have saved another vehicle to be enjoyed by the new owner.

However, in interviews, following his leaving the show, Edd China has hinted at, at least, some of the sales not having been 'real.' He stated that he, himself, had possession of both of the Cadillacs from the show.

Cast 
Mike Brewer uses his skills as a former car trader to scout and buy used cars to be restored and sold for profit. He's also responsible for procuring replacement parts and sometimes specialists to refurbish expensive parts.

Edd China was credited as the show's co-presenter, from series 1 to 13 doing much of the restoration and mechanical/servicing work, and giving viewers tips on how to sort out and solve various car problems, as well as estimating how much a garage would charge for such repairs. There were, however, always two other mechanics credited. 
 
On 21 March 2017, Velocity announced that China had left the show to "pursue other projects" and that he would be replaced by Ant Anstead in series 14. China explained that he chose to leave because he was disagreeing with the channel, which wanted to cut down his fixes and degree of technical information delivered in the workshop. As he surmised, the future series', featuring Ant Anstead, were a lighter format. 

On 2 November 2020, it was announced that Marc "Elvis" Priestley would replace Anstead as the main mechanic of the show from Series 17, when it returns to the UK after six years filming in the U.S. However, Anstead will appear occasionally as a special guest.

Since series 13, the programme has been produced by Discovery Studios (replacing Attaboy TV that had produced the 12 previous seasons), for Motor Trend.

Paul Brackley served as the series technical advisor, making sporadic appearances to assist China in carrying heavy parts or equipment in the garage, when China needed additional assistance, and helping Brewer tow non-running or non-MOT-compliant vehicles to the workshop.

Guest appearances on other shows 
While buying more American cars for the show, Brewer dropped in on Chip Foose during the 2 June 2013 (Lotus Europa part 2, episode #91, s06e12) of Overhaulin, where Foose showed Brewer the 1972 Lotus Europa he was customising.

Theme music
Throughout the 16 series of the programme broadcast so far, three different theme tunes have been used; the current one being "Balaclava" by the Wideboys.

The previous theme was from V-The Production Library by Music 4.

Spin offs
In April 2013 a spinoff series titled Wheeler Dealers Trading Up was launched. This series was produced by X2 Productions Ltd and has Brewer travelling around the world to buy and sell but not repair or restore used cars in different countries on a set budget. He begins with $3,000 and trades his way through the series up to a Porsche 911. It was recommissioned by Discovery Channel International for a second series where Brewer ends up buying a Ferrari.
A second spinoff series titled Wheeler Dealers: Dream Car premiered in January 2020, with Brewer and mechanic Marc "Elvis" Priestley lending their expertise to add value to clients' cars helping them trade up to their dream vehicle.

Episodes

Wheeler Dealers 
As of 28 September 2022 249 episodes have been shown covering 219 different vehicles with 12 recap episodes.

For series 1 to 6, each car was covered in two, half-hour episodes (including ad breaks). From series 7 onwards, each car was covered in a single 60-minute episode.

Wheeler Dealers Revisited 

Wheeler Dealers Revisited (ca. 2010) was a one-off special tracking down some of the cars that had been restored and sold a few years previously.

Trading Up

U.S. Top 5 Specials 

Discovery U.S.'s Velocity channel commissioned a series of one-hour Wheeler Dealers: Top 5 Specials hosted by Mike Brewer, featuring the top five vehicles of each genre Brewer and China have worked on during the first nine years of the show.

The specials began airing 5 June 2013, on the way to a Top 5 Viewer's Choice finale on 3 July 2013.

These episodes have been shown in the UK on the Discovery Channel at the end of season 11.1 and started on 5 May 2014.

Wheeler Dealers: Stripped Down 
Starting in 2020 Wheeler Dealers: Stripped Down is a re-issue of some of the older series, with each program cut down to fit a 30-minute broadcast slot.

Trading Up

Series 1 (2013) 
In this series made by X2 Productions Ltd, Brewer navigated his way through the culture and idiosyncrasies of the international used car trade, traveling to different countries. Episodes 1–3 and 5–6 directly connect with each other, with the final car of the former episode being sold in the latter episode. In the United States, airings on Velocity began on 10 July 2013.

Series 2 (2014)

Other vehicles 
Brewer has used a variety of vehicles on Wheeler Dealers to travel to see prospective vehicles and/or tow them if they are not in running order or street legal.

Brewer has used a Mitsubishi Shogun to travel around England since series 9 (2012). Vehicles used prior to series 9 include a dark turquoise Nissan Primera Estate (Series 1), a blue Subaru Legacy Estate (Series 4), a red Honda Accord Tourer (Series 2), a black SsangYong Rexton II, a dark blue SsangYong Kyron, a black Land Rover Discovery 4 (Series 7b), a blue Nissan X-Trail (Series 3) and a light blue Ford Kuga (Series 7a). For Series 8a, he used a black X-Trail. For Series 12b, he used a white Mercedes-Benz Sprinter to transport the Messerschmitt KR200 back to the workshop.

When Brewer travelled to France in series 5 to purchase a Citroën DS, he rented a French-registered black Opel Zafira; he rented a newer version of the Zafira when he returned to France to buy the Renault Alpine A310 in series 9a. Brewer used a French-registered silver Toyota Corolla Verso when he returned to buy the Citroën 2CV in series 11a. When he returned to France in series 12b, he rented a French-registered grey Audi Q3 to purchase the Citroën HY.

Trading Up 
For Trading Up, Brewer drove a white Toyota Fortuner owned by a used car dealer in India. In Dubai, Brewer's contact drove him around in a white Ferrari F430. In Texas, Brewer used a grey C2 Corvette. Taxicabs featured in the series included a yellow Hindustan Ambassador Grand and a green and yellow Bajaj RE in India, a black LTC TX4 in the UK, a black Toyota Crown Comfort in Japan, a yellow and red Volkswagen Sedan Type 1 in Mexico, a white Ford Falcon in Australia, a white Chevrolet Onix Sedan in Brazil, a yellow Dodge Charger in Texas, and a yellow Fiat 600 Multipla in Italy. For Hire Cars, he rented a Black Mitsubishi Shogun in the UK, a black Chrysler Grand Voyager in Brazil, a dark red GMC Yukon in Texas, a grey Land Rover Discovery 3 in Poland, and a white Fiat 500 in Italy. In Poland, when Brewer is taking the Fiat 126p to get vinyl wrapped, he borrowed a grey Opel Movano, to carry the car to the vinyl wrapping shop.

For the Wheeler Dealers: Top 5 US specials, Brewer stood in China's shop, in front of a red C2 Corvette.

Intro/segment vehicles 
The opening sequences and filler segments from series 1 to 9 featured the cars that were worked on throughout their corresponding seasons:

Series 1: All the vehicles done so far
Series 2 and 3: MGB GT
Series 4: Porsche 911 2.7S Targa
Series 5: Mercedes-Benz R107 280SL
Series 6: Ferrari Dino 308 GT4
Series 7: Lotus Elan S3
Series 8a: Jaguar E-Type Series 3
Series 8b: Dodge Charger
Series 9a: Fiat Dino
Series 9b: Gardner Douglas Cobra

Series 10 did away with using cars on the opening and commercial break sequences, instead using a title card with the series logo and the colour(s) of the episode's car on the background. The filler segments, however, used the following cars:

Series 10a: Aston Martin DB7
Series 10b: Lamborghini Urraco P250S

Starting with series 11, Wheeler Dealers no longer uses cars on the filler segments.

International productions

Sweden Special 
On 2 April 2012, the Swedish version of the Discovery Channel aired a special episode called Wheeler Dealers Sverige Special (Wheeler Dealers Sweden Special). In this episode, the Swedish presenters bought a Ford Mustang for 55,000 SEK. After having to refurbish the brake calipers, swap the engine and giving the car a new paint job, they were able to sell it for 135,000 SEK, giving them a total profit of 28,000 SEK.

Wheeler Dealers France
The popularity of the original UK series led to a French-language spinoff titled Wheeler Dealers France, which premiered on 10 October 2016 on RMC Découverte. The series is presented by Gerry Blyenberg and Aurélien Letheux. Brewer made a special guest appearance on season 2 episode 1 of the series.

See also
Deals on Wheels – An earlier programme presented by Brewer with a similar premise.
Salvage Hunters – A similar concept series, related to buying and selling antiques

References

External links 
  (Discovery UK)
  (Motor Trend Network)
 

2010s British television series
2003 British television series debuts
Automotive television series
Discovery Channel original programming
Conservation and restoration of vehicles